Ataxioceras is an extinct Ammonite cephalopod genus confined to the Upper Jurassic of Europe, included in the superfamily Perisphinctoidea.

Previously Ataxioceras was assigned to the Perisphinctidae but has now been placed in the Ataxioceratidae for which it is the type genus.

These fast-moving nektonic carnivores lived during the Jurassic period, from 155.7 to 150.8 Ma.

Description
The shell is evolute, strongly ribbed and moderately umbilicate.  Primary ribs, on the order of 32 -36 per whorl, are sharp and widely spaced, originate at the umbilical shoulder.   Secondary ribs form about mid flank, generally by trifurcation, but sometimes quadrifurcation (splitting into threes or sometimes fours) of the primaries. The umbilicus is about 0.4 the shell diameter.

Distribution
Fossils of species within this genus have been found in the Jurassic sediments in Germany, France, India and Romania.

References

D.T. Donovan et al. Classification of the Jurassic Ammonitina, in The Ammonoidea, M.R. House and J.R. Senior (eds); Academic Press 1981.  Systematics Association Special Volume. 18. 
Zipcodezoo-Ataxioceras
Fossiliensammler.

Jurassic ammonites
Ammonites of Europe